The 1983 LEN European Aquatics Championships took place at the Stadio Olimpico del Nuoto in Rome, Italy, between 22 August and 27 August 1983. East Germany won all women's events in the swimming competition, and also every silver medal available to them in individual events. Besides swimming there were titles contested in diving, synchronized swimming and water polo (men). The 4 × 200 m freestyle relay for women was held for the first time.

Medal table

Swimming

Men's events

Women's events

Diving

Men's events

Women's events

Synchronized swimming

Water polo

Men's event

References 

 

1983 in water sports
S
1983
International aquatics competitions hosted by Italy
European Aquatics
August 1983 sports events in Europe
1980s in Rome